Sintang Airport , also known as Susilo Airport, was an airport serving Sintang, the principal town of the Sintang Regency in West Kalimantan, Indonesia. The airport's function has been replaced by Tebelian Airport since April 26, 2018.

References

External links
Sintang Airport - Indonesia Airport Global Website

 

Airports in West Kalimantan